The Echo Murders is a 1945 British thriller film directed by John Harlow and starring David Farrar and Dennis Price. It was one of two films directed by John Harlow in which David Farrar played Sexton Blake, the other being Meet Sexton Blake (1945).

Plot summary
A man's life is threatened and he seeks the assistance of Sexton Blake.

Cast
David Farrar as Sexton Blake
Dennis Price as Dick Warren
Pamela Stirling as Stella Duncan
Julien Mitchell as James Duncan
Cyril Smith as Police Constable Smith
Dennis Arundell as Rainsford
Ferdy Mayne as Dacier
Johnnie Schofield as Purvis
Paul Croft as Marat
Kynaston Reeves as Beales
Desmond Roberts as Cotter
Danny Green as Carl
Patric Curwen as Dr. Grey
Tony Arpino as Fox
Vincent Holman as Col. Wills
 Gerald Pring as Sir Horace Cranston

References

External links

Review of film at Variety

1945 films
British crime thriller films
British black-and-white films
1940s crime thriller films
British detective films
Films directed by John Harlow
Films based on British novels
Films based on crime novels
Sexton Blake films
Films scored by Percival Mackey
Films shot at British National Studios
1940s English-language films
1940s British films